Tauranga Special School is a school for children with mild-severe learning and physical disabilities located in Tauranga, New Zealand. It is the only school of its kind in the Western Bay of Plenty region, and operates three satellite classes in Tauranga Intermediate school, Merivale Primary School and Te Puke Primary School.
The current principal is Barrie Wickens.

Notes

External links
 Tauranga Special School's website.

Educational institutions established in 1965
Special schools in New Zealand
Schools in Tauranga
1965 establishments in New Zealand